An extractive reserve ( or RESEX) is a type of sustainable use protected area in Brazil.
The land is publicly owned, but the people who live there have the right to traditional extractive practices, such as hunting, fishing and harvesting wild plants.

Definition

In the broad sense, an extractive reserve is an area of land, generally state-owned where access and use rights, including natural resource extraction, are allocated to local groups or communities.
Extractive reserves limit deforestation both by the local residents, preventing deforestation within their reserve, and by acting as a buffer zone to keep ranching and extractive industry out of the forests beyond.

"Extractive reserve" is among the types of sustainable-use, protected area defined by Law No. 9.985 of 18 July 2000. This established the National System of Conservation Units (SNUC).
The extractive reserves are of public domain but the use of the land is allowed for traditional extractive populations, largely indigenous. They are areas used by traditional extractive populations whose livelihood is based on extraction, subsistence agriculture and small-scale livestock raising.

The reserves are created to protect the livelihoods and culture of these people, and also to ensure sustainable use of natural resources.

Public visits are allowed where compatible with local interests and the provisions of the management plan for the unit. Research is permitted and encouraged, subject to prior authorization with the responsible agency.

On land

Extractive reserves in Brazil include:

At sea

Marine extractive reserves in Brazil include:

References

Sources

 Regulates article 225 of the Federal Constitution and institutes the National System of Units of Conservation and other provisions.

Further reading

 

Types of protected area of Brazil